Alan Trewartha Davies (born 1933) is a Canadian Christian minister and academic who is emeritus professor of religion at the University of Toronto, Canada. He is also an ordained minister in the United Church of Canada.

Career
From 1969 to 1989, Davies was lecturer and then associate professor in the religious studies department at Victoria College. From 1989 to 1998, he was professor at the Centre for the Study of Religion of the University of Toronto. Davies conducted research into the relations between Jews and Christians.

Publications
His books Anti-Semitism in Canada and How Silent Were the Churches? (with Marilyn F. Nefsky) received Canadian Jewish Book Awards.

References

20th-century Canadian Protestant theologians
Academic staff of the University of Toronto
1933 births
Living people
Scholars of antisemitism
Canadian biblical scholars
Religion academics
Ministers of the United Church of Canada